Crap or craps may refer to:

 Crap, a slang term for feces
 Craps, a dice game
 Craps (album), by Big Dipper, 1988
 Commandos de recherche et d'action en profondeur, the former name of France's Commando Parachute Group
 "Create, replicate, append, process", a version of create, read, update and delete, in computer programming
 Andreas Crap, member of German band Oomph!

See also
 
 
Crapo (disambiguation)
Krap, a musical instrument
Krapp, a surname
Thomas Crapper (c. 1836 – 1910), inventor of sanitary equipment